Columbarium altocanalis is a pagoda shell, a deepwater sea snail, a marine gastropod mollusc in the family Columbariidae.

Distribution
New Zealand.

References

Columbariidae
Gastropods of New Zealand
Gastropods described in 1956